Akeem Ancil Garcia (born 9 November 1996) is a Trinidadian football coach and player.

Club career

Early career
Garcia began playing football at age six with local club Arima Ball Masters. At age 17, Garcia signed for TT Pro League side San Juan Jabloteh.

W Connection
In 2014, Garcia signed with W Connection, scoring five goals in two league appearances that season. He received great recognition for his play that year and earned his first senior national team call-up in early 2015. Later that year during tryouts for the Trinidad and Tobago U23 team, Garcia tore his ACL and after undergoing surgery missed a total of twelve months while recovering.

North East Stars
In 2017, Garcia signed for his hometown club, North East Stars. He went on to score four goals in twelve league appearances that season as North East Stars won the TT Pro League, Garcia's first league title. Garcia also added another seven goals in other competitions that year.

Santa Rosa
In 2018, Garcia followed North East Stars manager Derek King to TT Super League side Santa Rosa. That season, he scored five goals in sixteen league appearances and ten goals in all competitions as Santa Rosa won the league title. After the end of the season, Garcia spent two weeks on trial with Mexican Ascenso MX side Celaya.

HFX Wanderers

2019 
On 10 January 2019, Garcia signed with Canadian Premier League side HFX Wanderers, where Derek King had signed as an assistant manager. Garcia scored the first goal in Wanderers history in the team's home opener on 4 May 2019. Garcia finished the season with a team-leading seven league goals in 24 appearances, tying for seventh among the league's top scorers. On 7 November 2019, Garcia re-signed with Halifax for the 2020 season.

2020 
Garcia excelled in the shortened 2020 Canadian Premier League season. He was a major part of Halifax's drastic turnaround from their previous last place finish, and the Wanderers made it all the way to the final, where they were defeated by Forge FC. In total, Garcia scored six goals in 10 matches, winning the Golden Boot. On 3 November 2020, Garcia re-signed with Halifax for the 2021 season.

2021 
Garcia struggled to maintain his form from the previous season, managing to only score 2 goals in 22 appearances. The team as a whole was also unable to match their performance from 2020 and finished sixth in the league. However, the forward was re-signed for the following season, as well.

2022 
During the 2022 CPL season, due to the ACL injury occurred to João Morelli, Garcia once again became the team's main attacking choice, together with Samuel Salter. He ended the year with four goals in 13 appearances, as the Wanderers finished second-to-last in the league table, missing out on the Finals for the second consecutive time.

At the end of the season, Halifax announced that Garcia would put his playing career on hold, in order to work as a coach at a local grassroots club in Nova Scotia.

International career

Youth
Garcia received his first youth call-up for Trinidad and Tobago as a 14 year-old at the 2011 CONCACAF U-17 Championship, but did not appear in the tournament. Garcia was called up again in the following U17 cycle and played in all three matches of  the Caribbean qualifying tournament for the 2013 CONCACAF U-17 Championship, scoring goals against the British Virgin Islands and Suriname. After Trinidad and Tobago qualified, Garcia was called up again for the finals tournament, appearing in all three matches for Trinidad and Tobago against Canada, Costa Rica and the quarter-final loss to Panama.

As a 15 year-old, Garcia first represented his country at the under-20 level in qualifying for the 2013 CONCACAF U-20 Championship, making five appearances as Trinidad and Tobago ultimately failed to qualify. Garcia was also eligible for the following U20 cycle and appeared in all five matches for Trinidad and Tobago at the 2015 CONCACAF U-20 Championship.

Garcia attended trials for the Trinidad and Tobago U23 team ahead of the Caribbean qualifying tournament for the 2015 CONCACAF Men's Olympic Qualifying Championship, but missed the tournament after tearing his ACL.

Senior
Garcia earned his first cap for the Trinidad and Tobago senior national team on 27 March 2015 in a friendly against Panama. He played the final 26 minutes of the match in a 0–1 loss. 

Following strong performances in the Canadian Premier League, on 4 October 2019 Garcia was recalled to the national side for a CONCACAF Nations League match against Honduras on 10 October and a friendly against Venezuela on 14 October.

Personal life
Garcia was born in Chaguanas and grew up in the Calvary area of Arima.

Career statistics

Honours

Club 
W Connection
Trinidad and Tobago Charity Shield: 2014

North East Stars
TT Pro League: 2017

Santa Rosa
TT Super League: 2018

HFX Wanderers
 Canadian Premier League
Runners-up: 2020

Individual 

 Canadian Premier League Golden Boot: 2020

References

External links

1996 births
Living people
Association football forwards
Trinidad and Tobago footballers
People from Arima
People from Chaguanas
Trinidad and Tobago expatriate footballers
Expatriate soccer players in Canada
Trinidad and Tobago expatriate sportspeople in Canada
San Juan Jabloteh F.C. players
W Connection F.C. players
North East Stars F.C. players
HFX Wanderers FC players
TT Pro League players
TT Super League players
Canadian Premier League players
Trinidad and Tobago youth international footballers
Trinidad and Tobago under-20 international footballers
Trinidad and Tobago international footballers
2015 CONCACAF U-20 Championship players